Sten Sture may refer to:

 Sten Sture the Elder (1440–1503), Swedish statesman and regent of Sweden 1470–1497 and 1501–1503.
 Sten Sture the Younger (1493–1520), Swedish statesman and regent of Sweden, during the era of the Kalmar Union.